Cieksyn  is a village in the administrative district of Gmina Nasielsk, within Nowy Dwór County, Masovian Voivodeship, in east-central Poland.

The village has an approximate population of 2,000.

References

Cieksyn